Activity-based proteomics, or activity-based protein profiling (ABPP) is a functional proteomic technology that uses chemical probes that react with mechanistically related classes of enzymes.

Description
The basic unit of ABPP is the probe, which typically consists of two elements:  a reactive group (RG, sometimes called a "warhead") and a tag.  Additionally, some probes may contain a binding group which enhances selectivity.  The reactive group usually contains a specially designed electrophile that becomes covalently-linked to a nucleophilic residue in the active site of an active enzyme.  An enzyme that is  inhibited or  post-translationally modified will not react with an activity-based probe.  The tag may be either a reporter such as a fluorophore or an affinity label such as biotin or an alkyne or azide for use with the Huisgen 1,3-dipolar cycloaddition (also known as click chemistry).

Advantages
A major advantage of ABPP is the ability to monitor the availability of the enzyme active site directly, rather than being limited to protein or mRNA abundance.  With classes of enzymes such as the serine hydrolases and metalloproteases that often interact with endogenous inhibitors or that exist as inactive zymogens, this technique offers a valuable advantage over traditional techniques that rely on abundance rather than activity.

Multidimensional protein identification technology

In recent years ABPP has been combined with tandem mass spectrometry enabling the identification of hundreds of active enzymes from a single sample.  This technique, known as ABPP-MudPIT (multidimensional protein identification technology) is especially useful for profiling inhibitor selectivity as the potency of an inhibitor can be tested against hundreds of targets simultaneously.

ABPP were first reported in the 1990s in the study of proteases.

See also
 Mass spectrometry
 Proteomics
 Related inhibitors MAFP and DIFP
Chemoproteomics

References

Proteomics
Genomics
Protein methods
Mass spectrometry